Macrepistius is an extinct genus of prehistoric ray-finned fish that lived during the Albian stage of the Early Cretaceous epoch.

See also

 Prehistoric fish
 List of prehistoric bony fish

References

Ionoscopiformes
Early Cretaceous fish
Early Cretaceous fish of North America
Prehistoric ray-finned fish genera